Devils Lake is a lake located in Deschutes County, Oregon, along the Cascade Lakes Scenic Byway and found at an elevation of .

References

External links

Lakes of Deschutes County, Oregon
Lakes of Oregon